Frank Carpenter may refer to:

Frank G. Carpenter (1855–1924), American author and photographer
Frank M. Carpenter (1902–1994), American entomologist and paleontologist

See also
Francis Carpenter (disambiguation)
Franklin Carpenter (disambiguation)
Frank Pierce Carpenter House, Manchester, New Hampshire